Oddingley is a village and civil parish in the English county of Worcestershire, approximately  north-east of the county town of Worcester.

History

Toponymy
Oddingley was recorded in 816 as Oddingalea. It was listed in the Domesday Book of 1086 as Oddunclei. The name derives from the Old English for "Woodland clearing of the family or followers of [a man called] Odda".

19th century
In 1806, Oddingley became known for the unsolved murder of the village parson, George Parker. Parker was shot and beaten to death by a man widely suspected to be Richard Hemming, a carpenter from Droitwich. Hemming was never apprehended and it was believed that he had escaped the country. In 1830, a body was found which was later identified to be that of Hemming.

Governance
Oddingley is in the Bowbrook ward of the Worcestershire district of Wychavon. It is part of the constituency of Mid Worcestershire, represented at parliament by Conservative MP Nigel Huddleston. It was part of the West Midlands constituency of the European Parliament prior to Britain leaving the European Union in January 2020.

Geography
Nearby villages to Oddingley include Hadzor, Newland, Dunhampstead, Saleway, Sale Green and Tibberton. It is situated close to the Worcester and Birmingham Canal.

Demography
The population of Oddingley, according to the 1801 census, was 110. In the 1991 census, the population of the village was recorded as 165. By 2001, this had grown to 197 with 77 households.

Church
Oddingley's church is dedicated to Saint James the Apostle and lies to the south of the village.
In June 2014, the church website was launched to provide more information about the history of the church, its current services and upcoming events.

References

Villages in Worcestershire